Call of the Ice is a 2016 documentary film about the director's effort to learn to survive  a Greenland winter while living as an Inuit hunter.

Synopsis
The film documents American-born film director, Mike Magidson, as he travels to Uummannaq, Greenland—where he has previously made three films: Ice School (2000), La longue trace (2003), and Inuk (2012). Mentored and outfitted by the local Inuit community, Magidson attempts to survive for several weeks, alone on an ice floe, using dog sleds to fish and hunt seal.

References

2016 films
2016 documentary films
French documentary films
2010s French-language films
Greenlandic-language films
Films shot in Greenland
Films set in Greenland
Documentary films about the Arctic
Inuit films
Documentary films about fishing
Greenlandic documentary films
English-language French films
English-language Greenlandic films
2010s English-language films
2010s French films